This Summer at Five is a 1963 Finnish drama film directed by Erkko Kivikoski. It was entered into the 14th Berlin International Film Festival.

Cast
 Martti Koski - Juhani
 Tuula Elomaa - Ritva Järvinen
 Carita Gren - Dark-haired girl
 Pekka Juutilainen
 Päivi Kaasinen
 Milja Luukko - Nurse
 Pekka Sahenkari - Advertising man
 Kaarlo Wilska - Night guard at hospital

References

External links

1963 films
1960s Finnish-language films
1963 drama films
Finnish black-and-white films
Films directed by Erkko Kivikoski
Finnish drama films